The 2022–23 Mid-American Conference men's basketball season is the season for Mid-American Conference men's basketball teams.  It began with practices in October 2022, followed by the start of the 2022–23 NCAA Division I men's basketball season in November. Conference play will begin in January 2022 and conclude in March 2023. The 2023 MAC tournament is scheduled to be held at Rocket Mortgage FieldHouse in Cleveland, Ohio for the 24th consecutive season.

Toledo won their third straight regular season championship with a 16-2 record in MAC Play. RayJ Dennis was named player of the year.  Second seed Kent State defeated Northern Illinois, Akron, and top seeded Toledo to win the MAC tournament.

Head coaches

Coaching changes

Ball State
On March 14, 2022, Ball State fired James Whitford after nine seasons with a 	131–148  record at the school.  Ball State hired UCLA assistant coach Michael Lewis on March 25, 2022.

Miami
After the season Miami fired head coach Jack Owens after five years and a 70–83 record. On April 1, 2022, Miami hired Travis Steele, who had been let go by Xavier at the end of the 2022 season.

Western Michigan 
Clayton Bates resigned on On March 7, 2022 as the head coach of Western Michigan after posting a two-year record of 13–39. On April 5, Michigan State associate head coach Dwayne Stephens was named the new head coach.

Coaches

Notes: 
 Appearances, titles, etc. are from time with current school only. 
 Years at school includes 2022–23 season.
 MAC records are from time at current school only.
 All records are through the beginning of the season.

Preseason
The preseason coaches' poll and league awards were announced by the league office on October 26, 2022.  Kent State was named as a slight MAC favorite over 2021–22 regular season champion Toledo and 2022 MAC Tournament champion Akron.

Preseason men's basketball coaches poll

MAC Preseason All-Conference

Regular Season

Rankings

Conference matrix

All-MAC awards

Mid-American men's basketball weekly awards

Postseason

Mid–American Tournament

Kent State defeated Toledo in the final to earn the conference's automatic bid to the 2023 NCAA tournament. Sincere Carry was the MVP.

NCAA tournament

Kent State was placed as the 13th seed in the Midwest Regional where they lost to Indiana in the first round of the NCAA Tournament.

National Invitation tournament

Toledo received an automatic bid to the National Invitation Tournament where they lost to Michigan in the first round.

Postseason awards

RayJ Dennis was the unanimous selection for player pf the year. 

Coach of the Year: Tod Kowalczyk, Toledo
Player of the Year: RayJ Dennis, Toledo
Freshman of the Year: Reggie Bass, Central Michigan
Defensive Player of the Year: Malique Jacobs, Kent State
Sixth Man of the Year: Jalen Sullinger, Kent State

Honors

See also
2022–23 Mid-American Conference women's basketball season

References